The fracture of soft materials involves large deformations and crack blunting before propagation of the crack can occur. Consequently, the stress field close to the crack tip is significantly different from the traditional formulation encountered in the Linear elastic fracture mechanics. Therefore, fracture analysis for these applications requires a special attention.
The Linear Elastic Fracture Mechanics (LEFM) and K-field (see Fracture Mechanics) are based on the assumption of infinitesimal deformation, and as a result are not suitable to describe the fracture of soft materials. However, LEFM general approach can be applied to understand the basics of fracture on soft materials.
The solution for the deformation and crack stress field in soft materials considers large deformation and is derived from the finite strain elastostatics framework and hyperelastic material models.

Soft materials (Soft matter) consist of a type of material that e.g. includes soft biological tissues as well as synthetic elastomers, and that is very sensitive to thermal variations. Hence, soft materials can become highly deformed before crack propagation.

Hyperelastic material models
Hyperelastic material models are utilized to obtain the stress–strain relationship through a strain energy density function. Relevant models for deriving stress-strain relations for soft materials are:  Mooney-Rivlin solid,  Neo-Hookean, Exponentially hardening material and  Gent hyperelastic models. On this page, the results will be primarily derived from the Neo-Hookean model.

Generalized neo-Hookean (GNH)
The Neo-Hookean model is generalized to account for the hardening factor:

where are the principle stretches.

Specific Neo-Hookean model 
Setting n=1, the specific stress-strain function for the neo-Hookean model is derived:

.

Finite strain crack tip solutions (under large deformation)

Since LEFM is no longer applicable, alternative methods are adapted to capture large deformations in the calculation of stress and deformation fields. In this context the method of asymptotic analysis is of relevance.

Method of asymptotic analysis 
The method of asymptotic analysis consists of analyzing the crack-tip asymptotically to find a series expansion of the deformed coordinates capable to characterize the solution near the crack tip. The analysis is reducible to a nonlinear eigenvalue problem.

The problem is formulated based on a crack in an infinite solid, loaded at infinity with uniform uni-axial tension under condition of plane strain (see Fig.1).

    

In order to obtain the eigenvalues, the equation above is substituted into the constitutive model, which yields the corresponding nominal stress components. Then, the stresses are substituted into the equilibrium equations (the same formulation as in LEFM theory) and the boundary conditions are applied.

Deformation and stress field in a plane strain crack 
For the case of a homogeneous neo-Hookean solid (n=1) under Mode I condition the deformed coordinates for a plane strain configuration are given by

where a and are unknown positive amplitudes that depends on the applied loading and specimen geometry.

It also presents the most severe singularity. With that, it is clear that the singularity differs if the stress is given in the current or reference configuration.

Deformation and stress field in a plane stress crack 

The crack tip deformation field for a Mode I configuration in a homogeneous material neo-Hookean solid (n=1) is given by

where a and c are positive independent amplitudes determined by far field boundary conditions.

The dominant terms of the nominal stress are

And the true stress components are

Analogously, the displacement depends on two parameters (a and c for a plane stress condition) and the singularity is stronger in the   term.

The distribution of the true stress in the deformed coordinates (as shown in Fig. 1B) can be relevant when analyzing the crack propagation and blunt phenomenon. Additionally, it is useful when verifying experimental results of the deformation of the crack.

J-integral
The J-integral represents the energy that flows to the crack, hence, it is used to calculate the energy release rate, G. Additionally, it can be used as a fracture criterion. This integral is found to be path independent as long as the material is elastic and damages to the microstructure are not occurring.

Evaluating J on a circular path in the reference configuration yields

For plane stress Mode I in a neo-Heookean material J is given by

where b and n are material parameters of GNH solids.

J-integral in the pure-shear experiment 
The J-integral can be determined by experiments. One common experiment is the pure-shear in an infinite long strip, as shown in Fig. 2. The upper and bottom edges are clamped by grips and the loading is applied by pulling the grips vertically apart by ± ∆. This set generates a condition of plane stress. 

Under these conditions, the J-integral is evaluated, therefore, as

where   

and is the high of the strip undeformed state. The function is determined by measuring the nominal stress acting on the strip stretched by :

Therefore, from the imposed displacement of each grip, ± ∆, it is possible to determine the J-integral for the corresponding nominal stress. With the J-integral, the amplitude (parameter a) of some true stress components can be found. Some other stress components amplitudes, however, depend on other parameters such as c (e.g.   under plane stress condition) and cannot be determined by the pure shear experiment. Nevertheless, the pure shear experiment is very important because it allows the characterization of fracture toughness of soft materials.

Interface cracks

To approach the interaction of adhesion between soft adhesives and rigid substrates, the asymptotic solution for an interface crack problem between a GNH material and a rigid substrate is specified. The interface crack configuration considered here is shown in Fig.3 where the lateral slip is disregarded.

which is equivalent to

According to the above equation, the crack on this type of interface is found to open with a parabolic shape. This is confirmed by plotting the normalized coordinates  vs   for different  ratios (see Fig. 4).

To go through the analysis of the interface between two GNH sheets with the same hardening characteristics, refer to the model described by Gaubelle and Knauss.

See also 

Fracture mechanics
Soft matter
 J-integral
Neo-Hookean solid
Gent (hyperelastic model)
Mooney-rivlin solid
Fracture of Biological Materials

References

Soft matter
Fracture mechanics